Stuart Holland Orkin is an American physician, stem cell biologist and researcher in pediatric hematology-oncology. He is the David G. Nathan Distinguished Professor of Pediatrics at Harvard Medical School. Orkin's research has focused on the genetic basis of blood disorders. He is a member of the National Academy of Sciences and the Institute of Medicine, and an Investigator of the Howard Hughes Medical Institute.

Early life
Orkin grew up in Manhattan, where his father was a urologist. He studied biology as an undergraduate (B.S., 1967) at the Massachusetts Institute of Technology and earned a medical degree from Harvard Medical School in 1972. He did postdoctoral research in molecular biology at the National Institutes of Health under geneticist Philip Leder. While Orkin was completing his training in hematology-oncology, his department chair, David G. Nathan, allowed him to establish his own research laboratory.

Career
Orkin is the David G. Nathan Distinguished Professor of Pediatrics at Harvard Medical School. He served as Chair of the Department of Pediatric Oncology at the Dana–Farber/Harvard Cancer Center from 2000–2016. He has been on the Harvard Medical School faculty since the late 1970s and has been a Howard Hughes Medical Institute investigator since 1986.

In the 1970s and 1980s, Orkin conducted research that identified genetic mutations associated with a group of blood disorders known as the thalassemias. This work led to the first comprehensive description of molecular defects in an inherited disorder. Later (1986), he and his team cloned a gene causing chronic granulomatous disease, marking the first time that a disease-causing gene was cloned without the researchers already knowing the protein coded by the gene. Today, his research lab examines transcriptional regulators of cell specification and differentiation. His laboratory cloned the first hematopoietic transcription factor GATA1 (1989). Starting in 2008, Orkin and his colleagues published a series of papers identifying the critical role for BCL11A in the developmental switch from fetal type (HbF) to adult type (HbA) hemoglobin. His group demonstrated that loss of BCL11A alone is sufficient to rescue the phenotype of sickle cell disease (SCD). In September 2015, Orkin published a study in the journal Nature showing a small section of DNA which could be responsive to gene therapy for sickle-cell disease.  Translation of the basic findings on the role of BCL11A in HbF silencing to the clinic is ongoing both with gene therapy and therapeutic gene editing.

Honors and awards
In 1987, Orkin received the E. Mead Johnson Award. Elected to the National Academy of Sciences in 1991, Orkin won the Jessie Stevenson Kovalenko Medal from that organization in 2013. He was elected to the Institute of Medicine in 1992. In 1993, he received the Warren Alpert Foundation Prize. The American Society of Hematology named Orkin one of its Legends in Hematology in 2008. The American Society of Human Genetics honored Orkin with the 2014 William Allan Award, which recognizes sustained and significant contributions to human genetics. In 2017, he was elected to membership in the American Philosophical Society, and in 2018 he received the George M. Kober Medal of the Association of American Physicians and the Mechthild Esser Nemmers Prize in Medical Science from Northwestern University. In 2020 he was awarded the King Faisal International Prize in Medicine. and the Harrington Prize for Innovation in Medicine. In 2021, he received the Gruber Foundation Prize in Genetics.

Personal
Orkin has been married for more than 40 years and has one daughter.

References

1946 births
Living people
American hematologists
Stem cell researchers
Massachusetts Institute of Technology School of Science alumni
Harvard Medical School alumni
Harvard Medical School faculty
Howard Hughes Medical Investigators
Members of the National Academy of Medicine
Fellows of the American Association for the Advancement of Science
Members of the American Philosophical Society
Members of the United States National Academy of Sciences